Easy Life (stylised as easy life) are an English alternative indie pop group formed in Leicester in 2017. They came second in the 2020 edition of the BBC's Sound of..., an annual music poll of music critics and industry figures to find the most promising new music talent. Their third mixtape, Junk Food, reached No. 7 on the UK Albums Chart a day after its release. Their debut studio album, Life's a Beach, was released on 28 May 2021.

Career
The band was formed by frontman Murray Matravers in mid-2017. They released their first single, "Pockets", via Chess Club Records in November 2017, and subsequently signed to Island Records. They released their debut mixtape Creature Habits in April 2018. Following the release of the singles "Frank" in July 2018 and "Nightmares" in September 2018, the band appeared on Later... with Jools Holland. The band finished 2018 by releasing their fourth single, "Temporary Love Part 1" (with B-side "Temporary Love Part 2"), in December. In 2022 they took to Glastonbury's Pyramid Stage, this was their second Glastonbury appearance and a remarkable step-up from their first on BBC Introducing. They featured alongside former Brockhampton member Kevin Absract, who joined them on stage and promptly forgot his verse.

They released their second mixtape, Spaceships, containing the single "Sunday" in March. They headlined the BBC Introducing stage at the Glastonbury Festival in June. Debuting as Annie Mac's "Hottest Record" on BBC Radio 1 in July, the band released the single "Earth". The music video, commenting on environmental issues, was shot at a plastic recycling plant in Morocco.

The band released their debut album Life's a Beach on 28 May 2021. It reached the number two spot on the UK Albums Chart.

They released their second album Maybe in Another Life... on 7 October 2022. Like the band's first album, it also reached the number two spot on the UK Albums Chart.

Band members
 Murray Matravers – vocals, synthesizer, keyboard, trumpet
 Oliver Cassidy – drums, percussion
 Sam Hewitt – bass guitar, saxophone, backing vocals
 Lewis Alexander Berry – guitar
 Jordan Birtles – percussion, keyboard, backing vocals

Discography

Studio albums

Mixtapes

Singles

References

External links

Musical groups established in 2017
British alternative rock groups
2017 establishments in England